Brandalsund Manor is a manor house in Stockholm County, Sweden.
It is located in the Ytterjärna Church Parish in Södertälje municipality.

History

There has been a castle or manor house at this strategically important location probably since the time of the Kalmar Union. In 1435, this castle was destroyed during the Engelbrekt rebellion by  Erik Puke. It was replaced by a manor house which in its turn was destroyed by Russian troops during the Russian Pillage (Rysshärjningarna) of 1719–1721. A later house was also torn down by the owner to make room for the presently visible main building, built in 1916–18 to designs by Thor Thorén (1863-1937)

References

Manor houses in Sweden
Buildings and structures in Stockholm County
Houses completed in 1918